West of Texas is a 1943 American Western film written and directed by Oliver Drake. The film stars Dave O'Brien, James Newill, Guy Wilkerson, Frances Gladwin, Henry Hall and Marilyn Hare. The film was released on May 10, 1943, by Producers Releasing Corporation.

Newill and O'Brien composed and sing three songs in the movie: "Whistle a Song," "El Lobo," and "Tired of Rambling".

Plot
The three Texas Rangers help a rancher falsely accused of sabotaging the railroad.

Cast          
Dave O'Brien as Tex Wyatt 
James Newill as Jim Steele 
Guy Wilkerson as Panhandle Perkins
Frances Gladwin as Marie Monette
Henry Hall as Bent Yaeger
Marilyn Hare as Ellen Yaeger
Robert Barron as Bart Calloway
Jack Ingram as Blackie
Jack Rockwell as Gabe Jones
Tom London as Steve Conlon
Art Fowler as Clem

See also
The Texas Rangers series:
 The Rangers Take Over (1942)
 Bad Men of Thunder Gap (1943)
 West of Texas (1943)
 Border Buckaroos (1943)
 Fighting Valley (1943)
 Trail of Terror (1943)
 The Return of the Rangers (1943)
 Boss of Rawhide (1943)
 Outlaw Roundup (1944)
 Guns of the Law (1944)
 The Pinto Bandit (1944)
 Spook Town (1944)
 Brand of the Devil (1944)
 Gunsmoke Mesa (1944)
 Gangsters of the Frontier (1944)
 Dead or Alive (1944)
 The Whispering Skull (1944)
 Marked for Murder (1945)
 Enemy of the Law (1945)
 Three in the Saddle (1945)
 Frontier Fugitives (1945)
 Flaming Bullets (1945)

References

External links
 

1943 films
American Western (genre) films
1943 Western (genre) films
Producers Releasing Corporation films
Films directed by Oliver Drake
American black-and-white films
1940s English-language films
1940s American films